The 1912 United States presidential election in Nebraska took place on November 5, 1912, as part of the 1912 United States presidential election. Voters chose eight representatives, or electors, to the Electoral College, who voted for president and vice president.

Nebraska was won by Princeton University President Woodrow Wilson (D–Virginia), running with governor of Indiana Thomas R. Marshall, with 43.69% of the popular vote, against the 26th president of the United States Theodore Roosevelt (P–New York), running with governor of California Hiram Johnson, with 29.13% of the popular vote and the 27th president of the United States William Howard Taft (R–Ohio), running with Columbia University President Nicholas Murray Butler, with 21.74% of the popular vote.

Results

Results by county

See also
 United States presidential elections in Nebraska

Notes

References

Nebraska
1912
1912 Nebraska elections